The Seattle Mariners 1987 season was their 11th since the franchise creation, and ended the season finishing 4th in the American League West with a record of .

Offseason
 December 5, 1986: The Mariners traded a player to be named later to the Pittsburgh Pirates for Rick Rentería. The Mariners completed the deal by sending Bob Siegel (minors) to the Pirates on December 10.
 December 10, 1986: Danny Tartabull and Rick Luecken were traded by the Mariners to the Kansas City Royals for Scott Bankhead, Steve Shields, and Mike Kingery.
 December 17, 1986: Ricky Nelson was traded by the Mariners to the New York Mets for Doug Gwosdz.
 March 31, 1987: Pete Ladd was released by the Mariners.

Regular season

Season standings

Record vs. opponents

Notable transactions
 May 12, 1987: Mark Huismann was traded by the Mariners to the Cleveland Indians for Dave Gallagher.
 June 2, 1987: 1987 Major League Baseball Draft
Ken Griffey Jr. was drafted by the Seattle Mariners in the 1st round (1st pick).
Pat Listach was drafted by the Mariners in the 23rd round, but did not sign.

Roster

Player stats

Batting

Starters by position
Note: Pos = Position; G = Games played; AB = At bats; H = Hits; Avg. = Batting average; HR = Home runs; RBI = Runs batted in

Other batters
Note: G = Games played; AB = At bats; H = Hits; Avg. = Batting average; HR = Home runs; RBI = Runs batted in

Pitching

Starting pitchers 
Note: G = Games pitched; IP = Innings pitched; W = Wins; L = Losses; ERA = Earned run average; SO = Strikeouts

Other pitchers 
Note: G = Games pitched; IP = Innings pitched; W = Wins; L = Losses; ERA = Earned run average; SO = Strikeouts

Relief pitchers 
Note: G = Games pitched; W = Wins; L = Losses; SV = Saves; ERA = Earned run average; SO = Strikeouts

Awards and honors
 Mark Langston – American League Leader, Strikeouts (262)

All-Star Game

Farm system

References

External links
1987 Seattle Mariners at Baseball Reference
1987 Seattle Mariners team page at www.baseball-almanac.com
Seattle Mariners 1987 schedule at MLB.com

Seattle Mariners seasons
Seattle Mariners season
Seattle Mariners